Petanjci is a village on the left bank of the Mura River in the Municipality of Tišina in the Prekmurje region of northeastern Slovenia.

There is a small chapel in the village. It is dedicated to Saint Florian and was built in the early 20th century in the Neo-Gothic style.

Notable residents 
 Johannes Kepler (1571–1630), astronomer, mathematician, and astrologer. In 1598, he spent a month at former Kastelišče Castle (Nádasdy Mansion), where as a Protestant he found refuge from Catholic persecution.
 Nika Zorjan (born 1992), singer and songwriter

References

External links
Petanjci on Geopedia

Populated places in the Municipality of Tišina